A solar furnace is a structure that uses concentrated solar power to produce high temperatures, usually for industry. Parabolic mirrors or heliostats concentrate light (Insolation) onto a focal point.  The temperature at the focal point may reach , and this heat can be used to generate electricity, melt steel, make hydrogen fuel or nanomaterials.

The largest solar furnace is at Odeillo in the Pyrénées-Orientales in France, opened in 1970.  It employs an array of plane mirrors to gather sunlight, reflecting it onto a larger curved mirror.

History 

The ancient Greek / Latin term heliocaminus literally means "solar furnace" and refers to a glass-enclosed sunroom intentionally designed to become hotter than the outside air temperature.

During the Second Punic War (218–202 BC), the Greek scientist Archimedes is said to have repelled the attacking Roman ships by setting them on fire with a "burning glass" that may have been an array of mirrors.

There have been several real-world tests to evaluate the validity of this myth over the centuries, including a test by Comte de Buffon (circa 1747), documented in the paper titled "Invention De Miroirs Ardens, Pour Brusler a Une Grande Distance", and an experiment by John Scott, which was documented in an 1867 paper. Greek scientist Dr. Ioannis Sakkas, curious about whether Archimedes could really have used a "burning glass" to destroy the Roman fleet in 212 BC, lined up nearly 60 Greek sailors, each holding an oblong mirror tipped to catch the sun’s rays and direct them at a wooden ship 160 feet away. The ship caught fire at once. Sakkas said after the experiment there was no doubt in his mind the great inventor could have used bronze mirrors to scuttle the Romans.

However, accounting for battle conditions makes such a weapon impractical, with modern tests refuting such claims. An experiment was carried out by a group at the Massachusetts Institute of Technology in 2005. It concluded that although the theory was sound for stationary objects, the mirrors would not likely have been able to concentrate sufficient solar energy to set a ship on fire under battle conditions. Similar experiments were conducted on the popular science-based TV show MythBusters in 2004, 2006, and 2010, arriving at similar results based on the premise of the controversial myth.

However, an episode of Richard Hammond's Engineering Connections relating to the Keck Observatory (whose reflector glass is based on the Archimedes' Mirror) did successfully use a much smaller curved mirror to burn a wooden model, although the scaled-down model was not made of the same quality of materials as in the MythBusters effort.

The first modern solar furnace is believed to have been built in France in 1949 by Professor Félix Trombe. The device, the Mont-Louis Solar Furnace is still in place at Mont-Louis. The Pyrenees were chosen as the site because the area experiences clear skies up to 300 days a year.

The Odeillo Solar Furnace is a larger and more powerful solar furnace. It was built between 1962 and 1968, and started operating in 1969. It's currently the most powerful, based on an achievable temperature of 3500 °C.

The Solar Furnace of Uzbekistan was built in Uzbekistan and opened in 1981 as a part of a Soviet Union "Sun" Complex Research Facility, being the world largest concentrator.

Uses 

The rays are focused onto an area the size of a cooking pot and can reach , depending on the process installed, for example:

It has been suggested that solar furnaces could be used in space to provide energy for manufacturing purposes.

Their reliance on sunny weather is a limiting factor as a source of renewable energy on Earth but could be tied to thermal energy storage systems for energy production through these periods and into the night.

Smaller-scale devices 

The solar furnace principle is being used to make inexpensive solar cookers and solar-powered barbecues, and for solar water pasteurization. A prototype Scheffler reflector is being constructed in India for use in a solar crematorium.

See also 
 Solar power tower
 Solar thermal energy
 Solar thermal collector
 Solar furnace of Uzbekistan

References

External links
Article about the Odeillo and Mont Louis solar furnaces
Hochflussdichte Sonnenofen des DLR, Köln
Page including an animation of a solar furnace
BBC News article about the solar power station serving Seville, Spain
Build a solar furnace

Industrial furnaces
Solar thermal energy
Heaters